WBPL-LP (93.1 FM) is a radio station licensed to Wilmington, North Carolina, United States, and serving the Wilmington area. The station is owned and operated by Ave Maria Radio Association. It airs a Catholic talk radio format.

References

External links
 WBPL-LP official website
 

BPL-LP
Relevant Radio stations
Radio stations established in 2004
2004 establishments in North Carolina
BPL-LP
Wilmington, North Carolina
Catholic Church in North Carolina